Săcel, Harghita, Hungarian name of a village in Romania
 , a part of Budapest, Hungary, now divided between districts II. and III. of the city
 Ilok, Hungarian name of a town in Croatia
 Újlaki family, medieval nobility from the Kingdom of Hungary
 Csák (genus)#Újlak branch, medieval nobility from the Kingdom of Hungary